Landen Akers (born July 7, 1997) is an American football wide receiver for the San Antonio Brahmas of the XFL. He played college football at Iowa State.

Early life and high school
Akers grew up in Cedar Rapids, Iowa and attended Washington High School, where he played baseball and football and ran track. He was named second-team Class 4A All-State as a senior after gaining 1,320 all-purpose yards and scoring 11 total touchdowns.

College career
Akers was a member of the Iowa State Cyclones for six seasons, greyshirting his first year at the school redshirting the next season. As a senior, he caught 18 passes for 269 yards with one touchdown. Akers finished his college career with 38 receptions for 593 yards and one touchdown in 48 games played.

Professional career

Los Angeles Rams 
Akers was signed by the Los Angeles Rams as an undrafted free agent on May 14, 2021. He was waived during final roster cuts on August 31, 2021, but was signed to the team's practice squad the next day. Akers was elevated to the active roster on November 28, 2021, for the team's Week 12 game against the Green Bay Packers. Akers won his first Super Bowl ring when the Rams defeated the Cincinnati Bengals in Super Bowl LVI. 

On February 15, 2022, Akers signed a reserve/future contract with the Rams. He was waived on August 30, 2022.

San Antonio Brahmas 
On November 17, 2022, Akers was drafted by the San Antonio Brahmas of the XFL. He was placed on the reserve list by the team on February 21, 2023.

References

External links
Iowa State Cyclones bio
Los Angeles Rams bio

1997 births
Living people
American football wide receivers
Players of American football from Iowa
Iowa State Cyclones football players
Los Angeles Rams players
San Antonio Brahmas players
Sportspeople from Cedar Rapids, Iowa